Raakhi Ki Saugandh is a 1979 Bollywood film directed by Shibu Mitra.

Cast
Vinod Mehra as CID Inspector Shankar Verma 
Ranjeet as Ranjeet
Madan Puri as Bachchan Singh
Ajit as Chamanlal 
Amjad Khan as Jagannath "Jagga" / Yahwar Pahwar Khan
Helen as Sweety 
Sarika as Paro / Tina    
Jayshree T. as Champa Bai 
Meena T. as Munni
Jankidas as Paro's Father-in-law 
Rajan Haksar as Georgy Dada

Soundtrack

External links
 

1979 films
1970s Hindi-language films
Films directed by Shibu Mitra